Valeri Akimovich Zverkov (born 15 February 1970) is a former Russian football player.

References

1970 births
Living people
Soviet footballers
Association football midfielders
Association football forwards
FC Energiya Volzhsky players
FC Tekstilshchik Kamyshin players
FC Mordovia Saransk players
FC SKA Rostov-on-Don players
Russian footballers
Russian Premier League players
FC Dynamo Stavropol players
FC MVD Rossii Moscow players